Arcane Astral Aeons is the ninth studio album by Norwegian gothic metal band Sirenia. It was released on 26 October 2018 through Napalm Records.

A lyric video was made for the single "Love Like Cyanide" released on 21 September 2018. The song features a guest appearance by Yannis Papadopoulos from Finnish band Beast In Black. On October 12, "Into the Night" was released as the second single along followed by a music video on October 19. Both videos were directed by Swedish filmmaker and musician Owe Lingvall.

Background 
Arcane Astral Aeons was composed by Morten Veland at the beginning of 2018, during the break of an intense North American tour that Sirenia finished in April.

On August 14, album details were revealed;  basically, is the same production and engineering of their predecessor work Dim Days of Dolor (2016). It was recorded between May and July 2018 in Veland's personal recording studio (Audio Avenue Studios) in Tau, Rogaland.  Additional recordings were made at Sound Suite Studios in Marseille.

In contrast to any other Sirenia previous album, all members contributed in the recording studio. Specifically, live guitarists Jan Erik Soltvedt and Nils Courbaron both played guitar solos on several tracks. Additionally, Emmanuelle Zoldan demonstrated her operatic vocal skills much more and 
wrote the French lyrics in two songs. About it and their intense promotion campaign, Veland said:
This album is something unique to us as it is the first one we have made together with our fans; everyone who have supported our pledge campaign has directly contributed to the funding of the album and to make it what it has turned out to be. [...] 
The album was mixed at Hansen Studios in Ribe, Denmark by producer and mixing engineer Jacob Hansen. The cover artwork was again created by Hungarian artist Gyula Havancsák from Hjules Illustration And Design.

Track listing

Personnel 
All information from the album booklet.

Sirenia
Morten Veland – harsh vocals, guitars, bass, keyboards, drum programming, engineering
Emmanuelle Zoldan – female and choir vocals, French lyrics on "Nos heures sombres" and "Desire"
Nils Courbaron – lead guitar on tracks 1, 2 and 10
Jan Erik Soltvedt – lead guitar on tracks 5 and 8

Additional musicians
Yannis Papadopoulos (Beast in Black) – clean male vocals on "Love Like Cyanide"
Østen Bergøy (ex-Tristania) – clean male vocals on "Aerodyne"
Stéphanie Valentin – violin
Damien Surian, Emilie Bernou, Mathieu Landry – The Sirenian Choir

Production
Gyula Havancsák – cover art work, design and layout
Béranger Bazin – photography
Terje Refsnes – mixing, engineering
Jacob Hansen – mixing, engineering

Charts

References

External links 
 Metallum Archives

2018 albums
Sirenia (band) albums
Napalm Records albums